The Secretariat of Public Works, Transport and Housing (SOPTRAVI) is responsible for formulation, coordination, 
execution and evaluation of policies related to housing, works of public infrastructure,  urban systems, transportation, and the management of public works. It is part of the Home Office.

History
It is responsible for sustainable development of transport infrastructure such as docks, railways, roads, airports and roads.

Originally designated the Secretary of Communications, Public Works and Transport (SEC-OPT) and later, the government of Rafael Leonardo Alleys added an entity for the development of communal projects designated Honduran Bottom of Social Investment (HBSI). In the government of Juan Orlando Hernández the office was renamed as Infrastructure and Public Services of Honduras INSEPH.

Presupposed
The annual budget is some 1600 million lempiras per year (80 million dollars).

The government of Honduras makes multiple investments in infrastructure from multiple ministries:
 Cabinet of Productive Infrastructure: 35,411 million Lempiras (22.85% of the budget) annually
 Infrastructure and Public Services: 3,074 million
 Productive infrastructure: 39,644 million
 Development and Social Infrastructure: 70,368.2 million
 Office of Public Works, Transport and House of Honduras (SOPTRAVI): 3 million 
 Bottom vial; 1,000 million

See also
 Highways in Honduras
 Demographics of Honduras
 Departments of Honduras
 Executive branch of the government of Honduras
 Politics of Honduras
 Transport in Honduras

References

Sources

External links
 https://web.archive.org/web/20100814124737/http://www.soptravi.gob.hn/dr/

Honduras
Honduras
Honduras
Transport organizations based in Honduras
Government of Honduras